In Rajasthan 'Nirban or Nirwan or Narban' is a clan of Rajputs who were close to the Prithvi Raj Chauhan of Ajmer.

Nirban (or Nirwan) is also a gotra of Yaduvanshi Ahirs of Alwar Jhanpuri Haryana, some of the villages of Nirban are in Mazarpur, Quni Daultabad near Pataudi, Pataudi, Guliara, Balag Noshehr, Selana and in the Samaypur, Badli and Haidurpur villages of Delhi, paprawat najafghar Delhi, Fauladpur, Jhunjhunu (Udaipurwati,  Alsisar, Mandrela, Khetri) Alwar

See also
 Nandvanshi
 Sikligar

References

Ahir
Social groups of Haryana